The Pocari Sweat Lady Warriors were a professional women's volleyball team that played in the Premier Volleyball League. The team was owned by Federated Distributors, Inc., exclusive distributors of Pocari Sweat in the Philippines.

The team debuted in the Philippine Superliga (PSL) in 2014 as the original Mane 'n Tail Lady Stallions. The following season, the team changed its name to the Philips Gold Lady Slammers,  while a new team assumed the Mane 'n Tail name.

On April 4, 2016, the team officially announced it will join the Shakey's V-League and play as the Pocari Sweat Lady Warriors.

On July 18, 2016, the Lady Warriors won the Shakey's V-League 13th Season Open Conference championship, beating the Philippine Air Force Jet Spikers in a best-of-three finals series. This was the team's first title.

On June 15, 2017, the Lady Warriors won the Premier Volleyball League 1st Season Reinforced Open Conference Women's Division Champions, beating the BaliPure Purest Water Defenders in a best-of-three finals series. This was the team's third and final title.

Name changes 

Mane 'n Tail Lady Stallions (2014, Philippine Superliga)  
Philips Gold Lady Slammers (2015, Philippine Superliga)  
Pocari Sweat Lady Warriors (2016–2018, Premier Volleyball League)

Current roster 
 
For the 2018 Premier Volleyball League Open Conference:

Coaching staff
 Head Coach: MSgt. Jasper Jimenez
 Assistant Coach: SSgt.Ray Acojedo

Team Staff
 Team Manager: Atty. Ken Mirasol
 Team Utility: 

Medical Staff
 Team Physician:  Maricel Ty
 Physical Therapist: Gorby Sanco

Former roster

Indoor 

For the 2018 Premier Volleyball League Reinforced Conference:

Coaching staff
 Head Coach: TSgt. Jasper Jimenez
 Assistant Coach: Ray Acojedo

Team Staff
 Team Manager: Atty. Ken Mirasol
 Team Utility: 

Medical Staff
 Team Physician:  Maricel Ty
 Physical Therapist: Gorby Sanco

For the Premier Volleyball League 1st Season Open Conference

Coaching staff
 Head Coach: Sgt. Rico de Guzman (PA)
 Assistant Coach(s): Romnick Rico

Team Staff
 Team Manager: Atty. Ken Mirasol
 Team Utility: 

Medical Staff
 Team Physician:  Maricel Ty
 Physical Therapist: Gorby Sanco

For the Premier Volleyball League 1st Season Reinforced Open Conference

Coaching staff
 Head Coach: Rommel Abella
 Assistant Coach(s): Clarence Esteban

Team Staff
 Team Manager: Atty. Eric Anthony Ty
 Team Utility: 

Medical Staff
 Team Physician:  Maricel Ty
 Physical Therapist: Dianne Catolos

2015 PSL Grand Prix Conference

Coaching staff
 Head Coach: Francis Vicente
 Assistant Coach(s): Rommel Abella Ma. Ara Mallare

Team Staff
 Team Manager: Atty. Eric Anthony Ty
 Team Utility: 
Medical Staff
 Team Physician:  Maricel Ty
 Physical Therapist: Christian Santos

2015 PSL All-Filipino Conference

Coaching staff
 Head Coach: Francis Vicente
 Assistant Coach(s): Rommel Abella Clarence Esteban

Team Staff
 Team Manager: Eric Ty
 Team Utility: 

Medical Staff
 Team Physician:  Maricel Ty
 Physical Therapist: Dianne Catolos

Beach 

For the Fit To Hit: Philippine Beach Volleyball Invitational:

Coaching staff
 Head Coach:
 Assistant Coach(s):

Team Staff
 Team Manager:
 Team Utility: 

Medical Staff
 Team Physician:
 Physical Therapist:

For the 2015 PSL Beach Volleyball Challenge Cup:

Coaching staff
 Head Coach:
 Assistant Coach(s):

Team Staff
 Team Manager:
 Team Utility: 

Medical Staff
 Team Physician:
 Physical Therapist:

Honors

Team 
Premier V-League:

Philippine SuperLiga:

Others:

Individual 
Premier Volleyball League

Philippine SuperLiga:

Team captains 
  Kaylee Manns (2014)
  Jill Gustilo (2015)
  Michele Gumabao (2015 – 2016)
  Gyzelle Sy (2017)
  Myla Pablo (2018)

Imports 
Premier Volleyball League/Shakey's V-League

Philippine SuperLiga

Coaches 
  Francis Vicente (2014 – 2015)
  Rommel John Abella (2016 – 2017)
  Sgt. Rico de Guzman (PA) (2017)

Notes

References 

Shakey's V-League
Philippine Super Liga
2014 establishments in the Philippines
Volleyball clubs established in 2014
Women's volleyball teams in the Philippines